The Serial Experiments Lain video game, based on the anime of the same name, was released for PlayStation exclusively in Japan on November 26, 1998 by Pioneer LDC. It is largely dialogue-centric, differing from traditional video game gameplay structures. Throughout the game the player, in the role of a therapist, unlocks pieces of multimedia information with the assistance of the source material's protagonist, Lain Iwakura, to explore her mental state. This material includes Lain's therapy sessions, her diary, notes of her therapist and video segments. The game shares the themes and protagonist, but not the plot, of the original anime series.

Gameplay
The game was designed as a "network simulator" which the player would navigate to explore Lain's journey between real life and online life. The creators themselves did not describe it as a game, but as "Psycho-Stretch-Ware", incorporating visual novel and non-linear multimedia elements; the gameplay is limited to unlocking pieces of information, and then reading/viewing/listening to them, with little or no puzzle needed to unlock. Lain distances itself even more from classical games by the random order in which information is collected. The aim of the authors was to let the player get the feeling that there are myriads of information that they would have to sort through, and that they would have to do with less than what exists to understand. As with the anime, the creative team's main goal was to let the player "feel" Lain, and "to understand her problems, and to love her".

Plot
The series of events differs slightly from that of the animated series. In the video game, Lain talks to a therapist, Touko Yonera, a character that doesn't appear in the anime, while most characters from the anime (like Alice) are absent from the game. Lain herself is basically the only common element between the two, and even the ending is different: while she erases everyone's memories and becomes an entity of the Wired in the anime, and kills Eiri Masami, in the video game she commits suicide to escape to the Wired, where she is finally joined by her psychiatrist. The game serves as a prequel to the anime set at a chronologically earlier date.

Reception
Unlike the anime, the game drew little attention from the public following its initial release. Criticized for its (lack of) gameplay, as well as for its "clunky" interface, interminable dialogues, absence of music, and very long loading times, it was nonetheless remarked for its (at the time) remarkable CG graphics, and its beautiful backgrounds. In 2008, an English fan translation project of the game's script began, eventually being released as a PDF in 2014. By 2021, a renewed wave of interest in the game had formed, coinciding with the release of lainTSX, an unofficial web browser-based port of the English version of the game, utilizing webGL. A review of the browser version for The Michigan Daily described it as "raw and realistic in how it showcases mental health, but also overflowing with empathy for the matter, something a lot of representation misses". The game has been cited as a precursor to later titles such as Her Story and What Remains of Edith Finch.

Notes and references

1990s interactive fiction
1998 video games
Cyberpunk video games
PlayStation (console)-only games
Japan-exclusive video games
Video games about mental health
Video games about virtual reality
Video games based on anime and manga
Video games developed in Japan
Single-player video games